WPWZ (95.5 FM) is a radio station broadcasting an urban contemporary format. Licensed to Pinetops, North Carolina, United States, it serves the Rocky Mount area.  The station is currently owned by First Media Radio.

History
WEQQ signed on in the 1990s, simulcasting the hot adult contemporary music WEQR. The station picked up the country music format and WKTC call letters of what is now WPLW-FM in 1998. In late 2003, the station played Christmas music and then became WPWZ "Power 95.5 FM", playing urban contemporary music by artists such as Beyoncé, Marvin Gaye and Ludacris, while WDWG took over the country music format. Starting in 2004, they began to play R&B all day as well as the Russ Parr Morning Show until 2006 when they switched to the Steve Harvey Morning Show.

References

External links
official website

PWZ
Urban contemporary radio stations in the United States